Two universities claim the succession of the Taras Shevchenko State University of Tiraspol: Pridnestrovian State University located in Tiraspol, Transnistria, and Tiraspol State University located in Chișinău, Moldova.

History
The original university in Tiraspol was founded in 1930 as the State Pedagogical Institute in the Moldavian Autonomous Soviet Socialist Republic (MASSR), then being a constituent part of the Ukrainian SSR located in Transnistria region. The institution was renamed in 1939 to honor the Ukrainian poet and painter Taras Shevchenko, on his 125th birthday.

In 1940, after the Soviet occupation of Bessarabia, part of the territory of the MASSR, including the city of Tiraspol, was allocated to the new Moldavian SSR formed by the Soviets.

In July 1992, as a result of the Transnistria War, the university was officially moved to Chișinău, where it continues to function under the name of Tiraspol State University (UST), while in Tiraspol it was reorganized as the Pridnestrovian State University (PSU). Thus the university was split in two, both claiming to be the original institution founded in 1930.

PSU

In Tiraspol, the university consists of 12 buildings. It offers internationally accredited courses in partnerships with universities in Russia. Students can study both internally and in absentia. Not only citizens of Transnistria can study there but also people from abroad. Education can be both free and paid. The university employs over 1,000 teaching staff including 36 Doctors and 220 Masters of Science. Among its publications, the Atlas of Pridnestrovie is often used as a source for data, specialized maps and statistics on Transnistria.

The university has 8 faculties and 84 chairs, offering 54 different majors. Classes are taught mainly in Russian, with only a few programs in Romanian (called "Moldavian in Cyrillic script") and Ukrainian.
 Agrarian and Technological Faculty
 Faculty of Natural Geography
 Faculty of Medicine
 Faculty of Pedagogy and Psychology
 Faculty of Physical Education and Sports
 Faculty of Physics and Mathematics
 Faculty of Philology
 Faculty of Economics

There are also four institutes and branches.
 Institute of Public Administration, Law and Social Sciences and Humanities
 Engineering and Technical Institute
 Bender Polytechnic Branch
 Rîbnița branch

UST
In Chișinău, the university has 5 faculties and 7 departments, offering studies in 42 specialties, 17 specializations, and 5 scientific specialties.
 Faculty of Physics, Mathematics and Information Technologies
 Faculty of Biology and Chemistry
 Faculty of Philology
 Faculty of Geography
 Faculty of Pedagogy

References

Shevchenko Transnistria State University
Educational institutions established in 1930
Tiraspol
Education in Chișinău
1930 establishments in the Soviet Union